Šuwardata (Shuwardata), also Šuardatu, is understood by most scholars to be the king of the Canaanite city of Gath (Tell es-Safi), although some have suggested that he was the 'mayor' of Qiltu (Keilah?, or Qi'iltu), during the 1350-1335 BC Amarna letters correspondence. Šuwardata was the author of 8 letters to the Egyptian pharaoh.

Sample of Šuwardata's letters
Besides letters EA 283, and EA 366, (EA for 'el Amarna'), only letter 280 tells of intrigues: See Labaya, or Abdi-Heba, as EA 280 claims: "Moreover, Lab'ayu who used to take our town, is dead, but now [an]other Lab'ayu is 'Abdi-Heba, and he seizes our town."

The other 5 letters do refer to the following: Qeltu-(Qiltu, Keilah:); silver (as mercenary pay); the Sun, (as Rê); the archer-forces; and the only reference to Rahmanu, an Egyptian official, (letter EA 284, "The powerful hand of the king").

EA 283: "Oh to see the king"--(no. 6 of 8)
All Šuwardata's letters are addressed to the pharaoh.

Šuwardata must have been an important regional individual, since he claims 30 cities, sub-cities, or city-states have been warring with his city.

EA 366: "A rescue operation"--(no. 8 of 8)
"Say to the king, my lord, my Sun, my god: Message of Šuwardata, your servant, the servant of the king and the dirt at your feet, the ground you tread on.  I prostrate myself at the feet of the king, my lord, the Sun from the sky (i.e.  'heaven:' ša-me ), 7 times and 7 times, both on the stomach and on the back.'May the king, my lord, be informed that the 'Apiru that rose up: na-aš-ša-a [נשא] against the lands, the god of the king, my lord, gave to me–and I smote him. And may the king, my lord, be informed that all my brothers have abandoned me. Only Abdi-Heba and I have been at war with (that) 'Apiru. Surata, the ruler of Akka, and Endaruta, the ruler of Akšapa, (these) two also have come to my aid: na-az-a-qú [נזעקו] (have been summoned to help) with 50–chariots, and now they are on my side in the war. So may it seem right in the sight of the king, my lord, and may he send Yanhamu so that we may all wage war and you restore the land of the king, my lord, to its borders: up-sí-hi. [אפסי] ((i.e. 'up-si-hi='borders' referring to article: Upu, also of the "Amarna letters"-?, putting Shuwardata's location on the perimeter?))  -EA 366, lines 1-34 (complete)

List of letters
EA 278—title: "As ordered (4)"EA 279—title: "A wasteland"EA 280—title: "Lab'ayu redevivus"EA 281—title: "Rebellion"EA 282—title: "Alone"EA 283—title: "Oh! to see the king.EA 284—title: "The powerful hand of the king"and from the later corpus:
EA 366—title: "A rescue operation"See also
Labaya
Abdi-Heba, mayor of Uru-salim-Jerusalem
Upu - (reference from letter EA 366 ?-(borders))

External links
A minor discussion of "Šamê"-(Sky/Heaven): "dingir A-num AN-e, dingir Anum,  Šamê"--(the Cuneiform); See: Dingir

References 
Moran, William L. The Amarna Letters.'' Johns Hopkins University Press, 1987, 1992. (softcover)

Amarna letters writers
Canaanite people
14th-century BC monarchs
Gath (city)